André Martin is the name of

 André Martin (physicist) (born 1929), French particle physicist
 André Martin (sport shooter) (born 1908), French sport shooter
 André Martin-Legeay, French tennis player
 André Martin (soldier) (1911–2001), French Chief of the Defence Staff (1961–62)

See also
 André Martins (disambiguation)
 Andrés de San Martín
 Andrés Martín (disambiguation)
 Andrés San Martín
 George André Martin